Dange  is a surname native to the Indian state of Maharashtra. The Dange surname is commonly used in the Deshastha Brahmin  community.

Notable people
 Shripad Amrit Dange (1899–1991), founding member of the Communist Party of India (CPI), stalwart of Indian trade union movement
 Anna Dange, an Indian politician
 JP Dange, an Indian Civil servant
 Srushti Dange, an Indian actress

References

Surnames of Indian origin